Dorycera hybrida is a species of picture-winged fly in the genus Dorycera of the family Ulidiidae found in 
France, Ukraine, Greece, and Turkey.

References

hybrida
Insects described in 1862
Diptera of Europe